The 2005 Monaco GP2 round was a GP2 Series motor race held on 21 May 2005 at the Circuit de Monaco in Monte Carlo, Monaco. It was the third race of the 2005 GP2 Series season. The race was used to support the 2005 Monaco Grand Prix.

There was only one race, held on Saturday. Polesitter Heikki Kovalainen finished fifth after an unsuccessful pit-stop, but was able to set the fastest lap. Irishman Adam Carroll, who started third, won the race by a margin of 0.657 seconds from Gianmaria Bruni. Nico Rosberg finished third, to score his first GP2 podium finish.

Classification

Qualifying

Race

 Ernesto Viso was disqualified for exiting pit lane under red light.

Standings after the round 

Drivers' Championship standings

Teams' Championship standings

 Note: Only the top five positions are included for both sets of standings.

References

External links
 GPUpdate.net

Monaco Gp2 Round, 2005
Monaco
Motorsport in Monaco